James Regan (born 7 February 1991) is an Irish sportsman. He plays hurling with his local club St Thomas's and has been a member at senior level of the Galway county team since 2011.

Playing career

Club

Regan plays his club hurling with St Thomas's. He made his senior debut in 2006 while he was still an underage player.

Inter-county
Regan first played for Galway at minor level in 2009. It was a successful year for the young Tribesmen as they reached the All-Ireland final. Kilkenny provided the opposition; however, Galway won by 2-15 to 2-11 giving Regan an All-Ireland Minor Hurling Championship medal.

The following year Regan joined the county under-21 team. Once again Galway reached the All-Ireland final where Tipperary provided the opposition. That game ended in a rout as Tipp won by 5-22 to 0-12.

Regan made his senior championship debut when he came on as a substitute against Clare in an All-Ireland qualifier in 2011.

Personal life
Regan is a teacher at Coláiste Bhaile Chláir in Claregalway.

Honours
St Thomas's
All-Ireland Senior Club Hurling Championship (1): 2013
Galway Senior Hurling Championship (5): 2012, 2016, 2018, 2019, 2020, 2021

References

1991 births
Living people
Galway inter-county hurlers
Hurling forwards
Irish schoolteachers
St Thomas's hurlers